Eric Macpherson Thompson McLellan  (1916-2010) was Archdeacon of Northern France from 1979 to 1980.

McLellan was educated at St John's College, Durham. After  curacies in Byker and Fazakerley he was Vicar of Everton, Liverpool then Rector of Sevenoaks. He was Chaplain at the Embassy of the United Kingdom, Paris from 1970 to 1980.

References

1916 births
Archdeacons of Northern France
2010 deaths
20th-century English Anglican priests
Alumni of St John's College, Durham